The Ora Caldera is a Permian supervolcano in the Southern Alps of northern Italy.

See also
List of volcanoes in Italy

References

Calderas of Italy
VEI-8 volcanoes
Permian calderas